Symphony No. 6 Sobre a linha das montanhas do Brasil (On the Outline of the Mountains of Brazil) is a composition by the Brazilian composer Heitor Villa-Lobos, written in 1944. It lasts about twenty-five minutes in performance.

History
Villa-Lobos composed his Sixth Symphony in Rio de Janeiro in 1944. It was first performed in Rio de Janeiro on 29 April 1950 by the Orquestra do Theatro Municipal, conducted by the composer. The score is dedicated to Mindinha.

An early report, based on conversations with Villa-Lobos in Paris in 1928–29, said that a Sixth Symphony (subtitled Symphonie indienne and based on Brazilian indigenous themes) had been written shortly after the Fifth Symphony, at about the same time as Villa-Lobos's opera Malazarte (1921), but had never been performed. No reference to such a work is found in the official catalogue of the composer's works, however.

Instrumentation
The symphony is scored for an orchestra consisting of 2 piccolos, 3 flutes, 2 oboes, cor anglais, 2 clarinets, bass clarinet, 2 bassoons, contrabassoon, 4 horns, 4 trumpets, 4 trombones, tuba, timpani, tam-tam, bass drum, large side drum, Indian drum, side drum, cymbals, vibraphone, celesta, 2 harps, and strings.

Analysis
The symphony consists of four movements:
 Allegro non troppo
 Lento
 Allegretto quasi animato
 Allegro

The main theme of the symphony was devised by projecting the outline of mountains at Belo Horizonte, Brazil, onto graph paper and transcribing the result as a melody. Villa-Lobos called this technique milimetrazação (graphing), sometimes rendered in English as "millimetrization". or "milmeterization". A harmonized version of this melody for piano, together with a similar treatment titled New York Skyline, was initially published in the October 1942 issue of New Music, devoted to works by Brazilian composers.

The first movement is in a slightly unconventional sonata-allegro form which, according to the composer's usual methods, omits the second theme from the recapitulation. The overall tonal centre is on C, with secondary key areas on D and G.

In the second movement, Villa-Lobos utilizes a technique of drawing attention to a pitch through its exclusion, in an arguably atonal passage in b. 33–47 where a clarinet solo weaves a long melody repeatedly using eleven chromatic notes, with the omission of the note G. This pitch is then introduced emphatically in the viola entrance at b. 47.

References

Cited sources

Further reading
 Béhague, Gerard. 1994. Villa-Lobos: The Search for Brazil's Musical Soul. Austin: Institute of Latin American Studies, University of Texas at Austin, 1994. .
 Paz, Ermelinda A. 1988. Heitor Villa-Lobos, o educador. Prêmio Grandes Educadores Brasileiros. Monografias Premiadas, 1988, Segunda Parte. Brasília: Instituto Nacional de Estudos e Pesquisas Educacionais. (Archive from 5 August 2016, accessed 14 February 2018.)
 

Symphonies by Heitor Villa-Lobos
1944 compositions
Music with dedications